Bele Chere was an annual music and arts street festival held in downtown Asheville, North Carolina.  The festival was previously held annually on the last weekend in July since 1979. It was the largest free festival in the Southeastern United States, attracting over 350,000 people.  The festival consisted of six stages scattered on various street corners in Asheville. A designated area called Arts Park typically featured several dozen regional artists and their work. Displayed art covered a variety of media types including painting, photography, pottery and jewelry. A variety of music genres were represented at the festival, including country, blues, folk, mountain, rock and jazz with both local and nationally known musicians represented. In 2013, the 35th annual Bele Chere festival was announced as the final festival by the City of Asheville.

Gallery

Economic impact
A 2007 survey of businesses in downtown Asheville indicated that for more than 80% of respondents, the festival was bad for business, resulting in significant revenue declines during the days on which it is held. Two factors contributing to this were the large number of non-local vendors arriving for the event and the rise in vandalism during the festival. Despite this result, more than half felt that if the festival were to continue after 2007, it should remain where it is currently located. In 1979, the festival began as a way to bring needed revenue to downtown Asheville, which contained many vacant buildings and spaces; however, since the late 1970s the area has recovered and now is financially hurt by the event. The event is revenue neutral for the local government.citation applies to paragraph

The City Council on March 12, 2013, discussed ending the celebration to help close a $1.9 million deficit for the city, stating it would save the city $200,000 the following year. There was no opposition.

See also 
List of festivals in the United States
List of historic rock festivals
Arts festival
Free festival

References

External links 

 Bele Chere Festival homepage

1979 establishments in North Carolina
Culture of Asheville, North Carolina
Tourist attractions in Asheville, North Carolina
Free festivals
Music festivals in North Carolina
Festivals established in 1979